Rudolf Allabert (3 September 1939 Gatchina, Leningrad Oblast – 10 March 2011 Tallinn) was an Estonian actor, director and theatrical pedagogue.

Until 1961 he worked at Rakvere Theatre. In 1965 he graduated from Tallinn State Conservatory. Allabert was a founding member of the Estonian State Youth Theatre.

In 2006 he was awarded with Order of the White Star, IV class. Following his death in 2011, he was interred at Tallinn's Forest Cemetery.

Selected filmography
 Keskpäevane praam (Jumbu; 1967)
 Inimesed sõdurisinelis (Kalm; 1968)
 Metskapten (Lauri; 1971)
 Tuuline rand (Coxswain; 1971)
 Verekivi (Kaspar; 1972)
 Indrek (Priimus; 1975)
 Surma hinda küsi surnutelt (1977)
 Karikakramäng (Robert; 1977)
 Tuulte pesa (Jüri Piir; 1979)
 Metskannikesed (Andres; 1980)
 Naerata ometi (1985)
 Saja aasta pärast mais (1986)
 Dubultnieks (1986)
 Viktoriya (1988)
 Surmatants (1991)
 Wikmani poisid (Mister Tooder; 1995)
 Misiganes, Aleksander! (Old Man; 2007)

References

1939 births
2011 deaths
Estonian male stage actors
Estonian male film actors
Estonian male radio actors
Estonian male television actors
20th-century Estonian male actors
21st-century Estonian male actors
Estonian theatre directors
Recipients of the Order of the White Star, 4th Class
Estonian Academy of Music and Theatre alumni
Academic staff of Tallinn University
Burials at Metsakalmistu